And/Or Gallery is a contemporary art gallery currently operating in Pasadena. Founded in 2006 by Paul Slocum and Lauren Gray in Dallas, the gallery has a particular focus on technology-based artwork. The gallery has exhibited artists including Petra Cortright, Paper Rad, JODI, Cory Arcangel, Olia Lialina, and Guthrie Lonergan.

References

Art museums and galleries in California
Contemporary art galleries in the United States
Art galleries established in 2006
2006 establishments in California
Buildings and structures in Pasadena, California